Hüsənli (also, Hüseynli, Hiisənli, Gusanli, Gusanly, and Guseynli) is a village and municipality in the Tartar Rayon of Azerbaijan.  It has a population of 2,093.

References 

Populated places in Tartar District